WKSO (97.3 MHz branded as Kiss 97.3) is a radio station that serves the Natchez, Mississippi area with adult top 40 music. The station is owned by Listen Up Yall Media.  The station was originally urban WNJJ-FM 97.3 JAMZ until flipping to Hot AC as KISS 97.3 with call letters WKSO-FM in 2003.  In 2006, Kiss 97.3 has shifted to adult top 40.

This station plays retro hits of the 1990s and Today with a slight mix of the 1980s.

Its transmitter is located in Natchez Mississippi on 26 Col John Pitchford Pkwy on the WNTZ-TV Tower With WQNZ-FM

External links
KISS 97.3FM Natchez Official website

Adult top 40 radio stations in the United States
Radio stations in Mississippi
Natchez, Mississippi
1993 establishments in Kentucky
Radio stations established in 1993